Vault Cocktail Lounge, previously Vault Martini Bar, was a cocktail bar in Portland, Oregon's Pearl District, in the United States.

Description
In 2016, Matthew Korfhage of Willamette Week described Vault Martini Bar as "a lounge-y refuge serving up umpteen versions of the classic martini, vodkatini or chocolatini". Later operating as Vault Cocktail Lounge, the bar had a Rick and Morty-themed drink menu and hosted disc jockeys.

History
Vault Martini Bar was originally owned by Casey Hopkin. In March 2018, the owners of Vintage Cocktail Lounge purchased Vault Martini Bar. The bar began operating as Vault Cocktail Lounge, starting on June 1, with an updated interior and drink menu. Vault closed by 2022.

Reception
In his 2014 list of "30 fireplace-equipped PDX drinking spots", Thrillist's Drew Tyson wrote, "One of the premier and priciest cocktail lounges in The Pearl, Vault makes it worth the cost, thanks to a roaring fireplace with lots of seating, and a horseradish-infused vodka cocktail named after Diane Keaton." Comparing Vault Cocktail Lounge to predecessor Vault Martini Bar and Vintage Cocktail Lounge, Willamette Week Pete Cottell wrote in 2018: 

The Portland Mercury 2019 overview of "100 Portland Happy Hours" said: 

In a 2019 overview of the most LGBT-friendly U.S. cities, Robert Deutsch of USA Today called Vault one of the "best LGBTQ hangouts" in Portland.

See also 

 List of defunct restaurants of the United States

References

External links

 
 Vault Cocktail Lounge at Thrillist
 Vault Martini at Zomato

Defunct drinking establishments in Oregon
Defunct restaurants in Portland, Oregon
Pearl District, Portland, Oregon